Air Vice Marshal Sir Cecil Arthur Bouchier  (14 October 1895 – 15 June 1979) served with the British Army, Royal Flying Corps, Indian Air Force and Royal Air Force from 1915 to 1953. He was Air Officer Commanding British Commonwealth Air Forces as part of the Occupation Force in Japan from 1945 to 1948.

Bouchier was married to Dorothy Britton, who translated a number of Japanese books into English.

Awards and decorations
Distinguished Flying Cross awarded to Flying Officer Cecil Arthur Bouchier on 18 November 1919.

The citation had the wrong first name and was corrected to Cecil in a later gazette.

 Squadron Leader Cecil Arthur Bouchier, DFC appointed an Officer of the Order of the British Empire on 23 June 1936 
 Air Commodore Cecil Arthur Bouchier CBE, DFC appointed a Companion of the Order of the Bath on 14 June 1945
 9 March 1948 Air Vice Marshal Cecil Arthur Bouchier, CB, CBE, DFC is allowed to war decoration of Commander of the Legion of Merit conferred by the President of the United States in recognition of valuable services rendered in connection with the war.
 Air Vice Marshal Cecil Arthur Bouchier, CB, CBE, DFC appointed a Knight Commander of the Order of the British Empire on 1 January 1953

Promotions
Trumpeter, Honourable Artillery Company
Flying Officer – 2 February 1918 (Royal Flying Corps)
Flying Officer – 1 August 1919 (permanent commission Royal Air Force)
Flight Lieutenant – 1 January 1926
Squadron Leader – 1 August 1935
Wing Commander – 1 July 1938
Group Captain – 1 December 1940
Air Commodore – 1 October 1946
Air Vice Marshal – 25 June 1949

See also

History of the Indian Air Force

References
Notes

Further reading
Air of Authority – A History of RAF Organisation – Air Vice Marshal Sir Cecil Bouchier
Air Vice Marshal Sir Cecil Bouchier, Spitfires in Japan – A Memoir, Global Oriental, 2005.
Grey, Jeffrey. The Commonwealth Armies and the Korean War: An Alliance Study. Manchester University Press, 1990.

|-
 

|-
 

1895 births
1979 deaths
Royal Flying Corps officers
Military personnel from Hampshire
Royal Air Force air marshals
Knights Commander of the Order of the British Empire
Companions of the Order of the Bath
Recipients of the Distinguished Flying Cross (United Kingdom)
Commanders of the Legion of Merit
Royal Air Force personnel of World War II
People from Fleet, Hampshire
Honourable Artillery Company soldiers